TalkLocal is a local search engine and marketplace based in College Park, Maryland and competing in the on-demand services industry. Through their mobile app or website, consumers submit service requests (e.g. HVAC maintenance, roofing, taxicab, etc.) to nearby businesses. When a business accepts, they pay to be connected to the consumer by phone (via Voice over IP) to schedule the desired service.

History
Manpreet Singh, Gurpreet Singh, and Amandeep Bakshi launched the service in 2011 in Potomac, Maryland, under the name Seva Call. All three founders are alumni of the University of Maryland, College Park. In 2014, the company rebranded to TalkLocal and relocated to an office near the university.

References

Online marketplaces of the United States